The Pontifical Commission of Sacred Archaeology is an official board of the Vatican founded in 1852 by Pope Pius IX for the purpose of promoting and directing excavations in the Catacombs of Rome and on other sites of Christian antiquarian interest, and of safeguarding the objects found during such excavations. In 1925, Pope Pius XI declared that the Commission was Pontifical and its competencies were defined in detail and reaffirmed recently in the conventions between the Holy See and the Italian State.

Background

At that period Giovanni Battista De Rossi, a pupil of the archæologist Giuseppe Marchi, had already begun the investigation of subterranean Rome, and achieved results which, if confirmed, promised a rich reward. In a vineyard on the Appian Way he discovered (1849) a fragment of a marble slab bearing part of an inscription, "NELIVS. MARTYR", which he recognized as belonging to the sepulchre of Pope Cornelius, slain in 253, whose remains were laid to rest in the Catacomb of St. Callixtus on the Appian Way. Concluding that the vineyard in which the marble fragment was found overlay this Catacomb, he urged Pius IX to purchase the vineyard in order that excavations be made there.

The Pope, after listening to the representations of the young Rossi, said: "These are but the dreams of an archæologist"; and he added that he had works of more importance on which to spend his money. Nevertheless, he ordered the purchase to be made, and he allotted an annual revenue of 18,000 francs to be applied for excavations and future discoveries. The Commission of Sacred Archæology was then appointed to superintend the application of this fund to work in the Catacombs and elsewhere. The first meeting of this commission was held in Rome at 1851, at the residence of Cardinal Costantino Patrizi Naro, who presided over it by virtue of his office, and selected its members, first amongst them being the Pope's Sacristan, Mgr. Castellani, whose office up till then included that of the preservation of sacred relics. Mgr. Vincenzo Tizzani, a distinguished scholar, professor of history in the Roman University; Marino Marini, Canon of St. Peter's; Father Marchi, S.J., and G. B. De Rossi, were the first members.

The work achieved under its direction has included the formation of the Pio Cristiano Museum; large-scale excavations and repairs in the Catacombs; the discovery and opening up of several subterranean chapels of third-century popes, of St. Cecilia, of the Acilii-Glabriones, and the Cappella Greca; the opening up of many Catacombs now accessible to visitors; the publication of the three volumes of De Rossi's Roma Sotteranea and his Bulletin of Christian Archæology, and many other works of a kindred nature. Under its auspices the Collegium Cultorum Martyrum, or "Association for Venerating the Martyrs in the Catacombs", and the "Conferences of Christian Archæology", were created. It also furnished financial assistance for the excavations made beneath the ancient Roman Churches of San Clemente and Sts. John and Paul, which brought to light underground churches long lost to sight and memory.

Management
The current president of the Pontifical Commission for Sacred Archaeology is Gianfranco Cardinal Ravasi (because of his position as President of the Pontifical Council for Culture), the Vice President is the Abbot Dom. Michael John Zielinski, O.S.B. Oliv., the secretary is Monsignor Giovanni Carrǜ, and the superintendent is Professor Fabrizio Bisconti.

The Pontifical Academy of Archaeology operates under its guidance.

Presidents of the Pontifical Commission 

Francesco Marchisano (4 September 1991 – 28 August 2004) 
Mauro Piacenza (28 August 2004 – 7 May 2007) 
Gianfranco Ravasi (3 September 2007 – present)

See also
 Pio Cristiano Museum
 Pontifical Commission

References

 cites:
MARUCCHI, Giovanni Battista De Rossi, Cenni Biografici (Rome, 1903);

External links
Commission official website

Organizations established in 1852
 
1852 establishments in the Papal States
Pontifical commissions